Demirayak is a village in the District of Evren, Ankara Province, Turkey.

References

Villages in Evren District